The Second Saint Petersburg Gymnasium is one of the oldest schools in Saint Petersburg, Russia. It was founded in 1805 by Emperor Alexander I. The Gymnasium is located in the Admiralteysky District of Saint Petersburg.

Many of the students are participants of all kinds of the city, national and international Olympiads, contests, conferences and competitions. There is a big number of prize winners among them.

The gymnasium is usually involved in international projects such as the MUN project with its annual international conferences, the Russian-Finnish project “ICT-based Education as a Driver of Change in Learning”, the International Science Olympiad and others; cultural exchange programmes, international festivals and competitions.

Academics 
Apart from Russia's basic curriculum, the Second Gymnasium provides an opportunity of extensive English and a second language (either German, Spanish, Chinese or French) learning. In the 8th grade students take many tests and decide what subjects they are willing to focus on; there are four focus areas available from 9th grade forward: math & physics, natural sciences, linguistics, and social sciences.

History 

The Gymnasium opened its doors on 7 September 1805 (it was named St. Petersburg Provincial Gymnasium back then). 96 pupils were admitted to the school on the opening day, but soon the number of students reached 400. Initially intended as a boarding school for boys of noble families, the Gymnasium, nevertheless, provided full-tuition financial aid for talented but poor children if they were able to pass the entrance exams successfully. Many notable university professors were invited to teach at the gymnasium, and its diplomas were considered on par with those of universities for public service employment.

After 1917 the gymnasium became a co-ed school, and its focus steadily shifted to providing general education with a practical emphasis. The name was changed from Petrograd Second Gymnasium to the 1st Unified Labor School of the Kazansky district; after that, the school was repeatedly renamed during the Soviet rule. In 1962 it was able to get a new status – profound study of English was introduced into curriculum, and that enabled the school's authorities to establish contacts with some schools abroad and start several exchanges programmes. In 1990 the school regained the status of gymnasium and reverted to its historical name.

Notable alumni

 Nicholas Miklouho-Maclay (1846–1888), an ethnologist and explorer
 Alexander Gorchakov (1798–1883), a diplomat and statesman
 Alexander Friedmann (1888–1925), a physicist and mathematician
 Alexandre Benois (1870–1960), an artist and historian
 Eugene Botkin (1865–1918), a physician
 Ivan Borgman (1849–1914), a physicist
 Igor Stravinsky, composer, pianist, and conductor
 Yuri Krutkov (1890–1952), physicist

References 

Schools in Saint Petersburg
Educational institutions established in 1805
1805 establishments in the Russian Empire
Cultural heritage monuments of regional significance in Saint Petersburg